The Pontotoc County School District is a public school district based in Pontotoc County, Mississippi (USA).

The district serves the towns of: Algoma,  Ecru, Thaxton, Toccopola, most of Sherman (the Pontotoc County portion), the communities of Randolph, and Springville, and most rural areas in Pontotoc County. It also covers a small portion of Pontotoc.

The headquarters are in Pontotoc.

Schools
North Pontotoc High School (Ecru; Grades 9-12)
2004 National Blue Ribbon School
South Pontotoc High School (Springville; Grades 9-12)
2011 5 Star School Mississippi's Highest Rating
North Pontotoc Middle School (Ecru; Grades 6-8)
South Pontotoc Middle School (Springville; Grades 6-8)
North Pontotoc Elementary School (Ecru; Grades K-5)
South Pontotoc Elementary School (Springville; Grades K-5)

Demographics

2006-07 school year
There were a total of 3,251 students enrolled in the Pontotoc County School District during the 2006–2007 school year. The gender makeup of the district was 50% female and 50% male. The racial makeup of the district was 10.43% African American, 84.68% White, 4.80% Hispanic, 0.06% Asian, and 0.03% Native American. 39.9% of the district's students were eligible to receive free lunch.

Previous school years

Accountability statistics

See also
List of school districts in Mississippi

References

External links
 

Education in Pontotoc County, Mississippi
School districts in Mississippi